Hirpora (or Heerpora) is a village, near Shopian town in the Shopian district in the Indian union territory of Jammu and Kashmir. It is the second largest village in the district, after Devepora. To the west of Hirpora is the Peer Ki Gali mountain pass over the Pir Panjal Range.

Most of Hirpora's area is occupied by thick forests. The Hirpora Wildlife Sanctuary was established between 1987 and 1989. The spiral-horned Markhor goat is a notable part of this wildlife.

Population
According to a survey conducted by the 2011 Census of India, there are 1,446 householders in Hirpora village, comprising 8,540 individuals, of which 4,449 are males while 4,091 are females. There are an average 5 persons to a house.

References 

Shopian district
Villages in Shopian district